Jack Wertheimer is a Professor of American Jewish History at the Jewish Theological Seminary of America, the flagship yeshiva of Conservative Judaism. He is the former Provost of JTS, and was the founding director of the Joseph and Miriam Ratner Center for the Study of Conservative Judaism. Wertheimer has written and edited numerous books and articles on the subjects of modern Jewish history, education, and life.

Wertheimer won the National Jewish Book Award in the category of Contemporary Jewish Life in 1994 for A People Divided: Judaism in Contemporary America. He was a finalist in 2008 in the category of Education and Jewish Identity for his edited volume Family Matters: Jewish Education in an Age of Choice.

Books Written or Edited

Unwelcome Strangers: East European Jews in Imperial Germany, Oxford University Press, 1987
 The American Synagogue: A Sanctuary Transformed, Cambridge University Press, 1987
 A People Divided: Judaism in Contemporary America, Basic Books, 1993; Brandeis University Press, 1997
 The Uses of Tradition: Jewish Continuity in the Modern Era, JTS Press/Harvard, 1993
 The Modern Jewish Experience: A Reader's Guide, NYU Press, 1993
 Tradition Renewed: A History of the Jewish Theological Seminary, JTS Press, 1997
 Jews in the Center: Conservative Synagogues and Their Members, Rutgers University Press, 2000
 Jewish Religious Leadership: Image and Reality, JTS Press, 2004
 Family Matters: Jewish Education in an Age of Choice, Brandeis University Press, 2007
 Imagining the American Jewish Community, Brandeis University Press, 2007
 Learning and Community: Jewish Supplementary School in the Twenty-first Century, Brandeis University Press, 2009
The New American Judaism: How Jews Practice Their Religion Today, Princeton University Press, 2018 (Winner of a 2018 National Jewish Book Award) 
Inside Jewish Day Schools: Leadership, Learning, and Community, Brandeis University Press, 2021

References

External links
Jack Wertheimer's biography in The Jewish Theological Seminary website
The author about his book, The New American Judaism: How Jews Practice Their Religion Today in Chicago Jewish Cafe
 Jack Wertheimer publications on the Berman Jewish Policy Archive @ NYU Wagner

Year of birth missing (living people)
Living people
Jewish Theological Seminary of America faculty